Little Things of Venom is the first album by Belgian band Arid. It was first released in 1998 under Belgium's Double T record label, and again in 2000 by Columbia Records in the United States, under the name At the Close of Every Day.

Track listing
All songs written by Jasper Steverlinck and David Du Pré.
 "At the Close of Every Day" – 3:41
 "Too Late Tonight" – 4:01
 "All Will Wait" – 3:47
 "Little Things of Venom" – 4:35
 "Believer" – 3:30
 "Dearly Departed" – 5:41
 "Me and My Melody" – 5:02
 "World Weary Eyes" – 3:10
 "Life" – 4:27
 "Elegy" – 3:08

Bonus track
On the Austrian and U.S. releases of the album, an eleventh track titled "Soirée" was included. It runs for 5:13.

Licensing
Track four, "Little Things Of Venom", was used in the soundtrack for the IMAX 3-D film Haunted Castle (2001), in which lead singer Steverlinck also starred.

Certifications

References

1998 debut albums
Arid (band) albums